The Internationalist Communist Party (PCInt) is a left communist party in Italy and an affiliate of the Internationalist Communist Tendency, formerly the International Bureau for the Revolutionary Party.

Overview 
The origins of the party can be traced back to the Left Fraction which, between 1921-6, held a majority within the Communist Party of Italy. The Internationalist Communist Party itself was founded in 1943 by Onorato Damen and the group of revolutionaries around the journal Prometeo. It denounced the Second World War as imperialist and took an active part in the strike wave that shook northern Italy at the end of 1943. In 1952 Amadeo Bordiga split the party to form his own International Communist Party.

The basic positions of Battaglia Comunista were as follows:

 Rosa Luxemburg and not Lenin was right on the national question.
 The old Communist Parties (now fully Stalinised) were not centrist but bourgeois.
 There was no hope of conquering the unions and that new strategies towards the daily class struggle would have to be evolved to connect the daily struggle of the class to the longer term struggle for communism.
 The USSR was not a neither-nor society but state capitalist.
 There could be no substitution of the party for the class as a whole.

The party initiated a series of conferences of the communist left in the late 1970s and early 1980s. As a result of these, in 1983 they established the International Bureau for the Revolutionary Party (later renamed as the Internationalist Communist Tendency) with the British Communist Workers' Organisation.

Election results

Constituent Assembly

Chamber of Deputies

See also 
 Communist Party (British Section of the Third International)
 International Communist Party
 Internationalist Communist Party (France)

Further reading

References

External links 
 Official website
 Battaglia Comunista Facebook page
 Battaglia Comunista Twitter page
 Fondo: Stefanini Mauro Partito comunista internazionalista

Bordigism
Left communist organizations
Luxemburgism
Communist parties in Italy
Far-left politics